Ohio History is a peer-reviewed academic journal covering the history of Ohio and the Midwest. The journal was established in 1887 and published by the Ohio Historical Society. Since 2007 it is published annually by the Kent State University Press. The Ohio Historical Society maintains an online, searchable archive of volumes 1–113, sponsored by the Ohio Public Library Information Network.

In spring 2020, Ohio History transitioned from being a hard copy print journal to an online open access publication with the stated goal of making scholarship more widely available.

History 
The journal has been known by a variety of names:
 Vol. 1–2 Ohio Archaeological and Historical Quarterly
 Vol. 3–43 Ohio Archaeological and Historical Publications
 Vol. 44–58 Ohio Archaeological and Historical Quarterly
 Vol. 59–63 Ohio State Archaeological and Historical Quarterly
 Vol. 64–70 The Ohio Historical Quarterly
 Vol. 71–present Ohio History

References

External links
 
 Online archive of past volumes of Ohio History
 Ohio History archives at Open Access Kent States (OAKS)

History of Ohio
History of the United States journals
Annual journals
Publications established in 1887
English-language journals